AIIB may refer to:
 Asian Infrastructure Investment Bank, a development bank for the Asia-Pacific region
 Japanese Red Army, also known as the Anti-Imperialist International Brigade
 Quorum-quenching N-acyl-homoserine lactonase, an enzyme also known as AiiB